Okanagan Centre is a neighbourhood and formal ward within Lake Country, British Columbia, Canada. It is on the east shore of Okanagan Lake to the north of Kelowna and just northwest of Winfield, another wards of the District of Lake Country.

History
Okanagan Centre was originally designated as a "post office, steamer landing and settlement" in 1930, then revised in 1951 to "post office and steamer landing", and it was designated a "community" in 1983. Okanagan Centre was incorporated to the district municipality of Lake Country in 1995.

Climate
Okanagan Centre has an inland oceanic climate (Cfb) or a marginal continental climate (Dfb) depending on the isotherm. The waters of Okanagan Lake help to moderate winter temperatures, meaning that the area has more in common with more southerly Penticton in terms of climate.

Images

References

Neighbourhoods in Lake Country
Populated places on Okanagan Lake